Mohammed Al-Thani (born 22 January 1997) is a Saudi Arabian professional footballer who plays as a winger for Ohod.

Career
Al-Thani began his career at the youth team of Al-Faisaly. He was part of the U23 squad that won the final edition of the Saudi Olympic League. He signed his first professional contract with the club on 4 February 2019. He made his league debut for Al-Faisaly on 23 February 2019 in the league match against Al-Raed. On 7 January 2020, Al-Thani joined fellow Pro League side Al-Ittihad on a six-month loan. On 28 October 2020, Al-Thani joined Ohod on a free transfer. On 11 July 2021, Al-Thani joined Al-Tai on loan.

Career statistics

Club

References

External links 
 

1997 births
Living people
Saudi Arabian footballers
Al-Faisaly FC players
Ittihad FC players
Ohod Club players
Al-Tai FC players
Saudi Professional League players
Saudi First Division League players
Association football wingers